Gerlinde Kaltenbrunner (born 13 December 1970) is an Austrian mountaineer. In August 2011, she became the second woman to climb the fourteen eight-thousanders and the first woman to do so without the use of supplementary oxygen or high altitude porters. In 2012, she won the prestigious National Geographic Explorer of the Year Award.

Mountaineering
Her interest in mountain climbing developed at a young age, and by the age of 13 she had completed climbing tours at the local Sturzhahn. As she pursued her nursing training in Vienna, Austria, she continued to hone her skills by participating in numerous ski, ice- and rock-climbing tours.  At the age of 32, Kaltenbrunner climbed her fourth 8000m peak, Nanga Parbat, and decided to pursue professional mountain climbing full-time.

Eight-thousanders

Together with Edurne Pasaban and Nives Meroi she is one of only three women who have climbed the fourteen eight-thousanders. Kaltenbrunner climbs without supplemental oxygen, which makes her the first woman to officially reach all fourteen eight-thousanders without the use of supplementary oxygen. Oh Eun-Sun claimed to be the first female mountaineer to summit all fourteen eight-thousanders. However, her claim has been listed as "disputed" due to the controversy surrounding her climb on Kangchenjunga. Later on she admitted that she could not summit Kangchenjunga and had to stop a few meters before the summit.

 1998 – Cho Oyu
 2001 – Makalu
 2002 – Manaslu
 2003 – Nanga Parbat
 2004 – Annapurna I
 2004 – Gasherbrum I
 2005 – Shisha Pangma
 2005 – Gasherbrum II
 2006 – Kangchenjunga
 2007 – Broad Peak
 2008 – Dhaulagiri
 2009 – Lhotse
 2010 – Mount Everest
 2011 – K2

She summited Broad Peak on 12 July 2007, together with Edurne Pasaban. On 1 May 2008, Kaltenbrunner summited Dhaulagiri, as did Pasaban. At that time both downplayed the aspect of a race between them for the first woman to climb all fourteen eight-thousanders.

On 6 August 2010, Fredrik Ericsson joined Kaltenbrunner on the way to the summit of K2. Ericsson fell  and was killed. Kaltenbrunner, who saw Ericsson fall, aborted her summit attempt.

Kaltenbrunner had previously attempted to climb K2 six times  and finally succeeded on 23 August 2011, during her seventh expedition to the mountain. National Geographic supported the expedition and provided an account of the epic North Pillar climb.

Personal life
In 2007, she married her mountaineering partner Ralf Dujmovits, from whom she later divorced.

See also
List of female adventurers

References

External links

Gerlinde Kaltenbrunners website 
Gerlinde Kaltenbrunner's book: Mountains in My Heart - A Passion for Climbing (Transl. 2014)

1970 births
Living people
Austrian mountain climbers
Austrian sportspeople
Summiters of all 14 eight-thousanders
Female climbers
Summiters of K2